Langeoog is one of the seven inhabited East Frisian Islands at the edge of the Lower Saxon Wadden Sea in the southern North Sea, located between Baltrum Island (west), and Spiekeroog (east). It is also a municipality in the district of Wittmund in Lower Saxony, Germany. The name Langeoog means Long Island in the Low German dialect.

Geography

Geology
Langeoog is geologically nothing but sand. Rainwater that falls into the sand has a lower density than saltwater, which makes a kind of freshwater bubble float over the saltwater surrounding and deep under the island.

The beach and the dunes are eroded by the sea in the western part of the island. Since about 1970, Langeoog's western end has moved several hundred metres to the east.  This happens on every East Frisian islandsome islands moved so far that the town had to be rebuilt several times. Every island except Juist and Langeoog has large concrete groynes at its western end to reduce erosion.

History

Storm tides
In 1717 Langeoog was cut in three parts by the Christmas storm tide.

Deaths
Johannes Letzmann died on Langeoog.

Transportation

Langeoog can be reached from  port on the East Frisian mainland by the ferries of the Langeoog Shipping Company: Langeoog I, Langeoog II, Langeoog III and Langeoog IV. Langeoog ferries' schedule does not depend on the tide, which is unusual among East Frisian ferries.

The port and the town are linked by a railway, and Langeoog also has an airport.

Langeoog largely has a no automobile policy. Visitors to the island have to leave their cars on the mainland. Only the fire department and ambulance service have standard motorized vehicles. Tractors and heavy construction vehicles can be operated within limits. The policemen and doctors get about on bicycles. Some companies (construction, drink delivery, post office, etc.) have electric cars. The post office and the shipping company have one electric car each. If one does not want to walk, one can rent a bicycle or take a horse carriage taxi.

Tourism
Tourism is the main source of income for Langeoog's economy.  There are guest rooms in almost all island buildings.  There are also several hotels. The youth hostel is several kilometers outside the town.

The island's unpolluted air makes it popular with people who have respiratory problems.

Landmarks

 Langeoog's water tower
 The tower of the Catholic Church
 The tower of the Protestant church
 The MelkhörndüneThis was once East Frisia's highest natural elevation and, as such, a tourist attraction. The thousands of visitors every year walking to the top of it shifted the sand and the dune is no longer the highest point, which is now the White Dune on the neighbouring island of Spiekeroog.
 The Seenotbeobachtungsstelle, the watchtower of the lifeboat service

Famous people
Singer-songwriter Lale Andersen, whose 1939 interpretation of the song Lili Marleen became tremendously popular during World War II, lived here for several years. Although she died in Vienna in 1972, she is buried on the island's dune cemetery.  A bronze memorial in her honor has been erected on Langeoog.

See also 
 List of ferry boats of the East Frisian Islands

References

External links

  
 Langeoog Island Ferry 
 Langeoog Online – Travel and Tourism Directory 
 Die Langeooger – Photos from former boarding school times 

 
Islands of Lower Saxony
East Frisian Islands
Towns and villages in East Frisia
Car-free zones in Europe
Seaside resorts in Germany
Wittmund (district)